Memecylon cerasiforme is a species of plant in the family Melastomataceae. It is native to India (Chittagong, North East India), Burma, Bangladesh.

References

Flora of Assam (region)
cerasiforme